Belgrave St Ives is a commercial art gallery, specialising in modern British and contemporary art in St Ives, Cornwall, southwest England. It gives emphasis to work produced in Cornwall from the 1930s onwards, when the town of St Ives became an internationally important modernist artistic centre.

History
The original gallery opened in 1974 in Motcomb Street, Belgravia, London. It moved to various London locations, including Mayfair, St James's, and Belsize Park until a St Ives sister gallery opened in 1998. In 2010 the St Ives gallery became independent and continues as the sole remaining part of the Belgrave Gallery enterprise. It maintains a programme of exhibitions of work by major artists associated with the St Ives Modern Period, such as Wilhelmina Barns-Graham and Terry Frost, as well as representing those formerly overshadowed in conventional accounts of Modern British art recently gaining greater prominence such as Sven Berlin. Works by other Modern British and contemporary artists are also shown. An annual fixture is the St Ives Exhibition, usually in the early summer, which focuses on Modernist art produced by those associated with the town.

Publications
The gallery has published books on the artists Terry Frost, 
John Milne
and Patrick Hayman, 
as well as to accompany exhibitions of work from Sven Berlin, 
Terry Frost, 
and artists at the Camberwell College of Arts.

Notable exhibitions

Motcomb Street, Belgravia 
 15 March – 16 April 1978 Jewish Artists of Great Britain 1845–1945

Masons Yard, St James's
 21 February – 29 March 1985 British Post-Impressionists and Moderns
 10 May – 3 June 1988 Camberwell Artists of the ‘40s and ‘50s
 12 October – 3 November 1989 Terry Frost
 23 November – 15 December 1989 Sven Berlin- Paintings, Drawings and Sculpture
 15 March – 6 April 1990 Some of the Moderns
 14 June – 13 July 1990 Jack Pender
 17 October – 9 November 1990 Michael Canney- Paintings, Constructions and Reliefs
 11–21 December 1990 Jacob Kramer 1892–1962
 6–28 March 1991 Willi Soukop RA
 5–27 March 1992 British Abstract Art of the ‘50s and ‘60s
 17 June – 10 July 1992 Stephen Gilbert- Sculpture of the ‘60s and Works on Paper

England's Lane, Belsize Park
 15 March – 5 April 2001 Conroy Maddox- A Surrealist Odyssey

St Ives
 7–30 November 2015 40 Years of Painting- Camberwell Students and Teachers 1945–1985
 10 September – 3 October 2016 Wilhelmina Barns-Graham- St Andrews and St Ives
 19 June – 15 July 2017 Terry Frost- A Book of Ideas

Artists

References

External links

 Gallery website

1974 establishments in England
Art galleries established in 1974
Contemporary art galleries in England
Art museums and galleries in St Ives, Cornwall